National Route 122 is a national highway of Japan connecting Nikkō, Tochigi and Toshima, Tokyo in Japan, with a total length of 158.3 km (98.36 mi).

Route description
A section of National Route 122 in Midori in Gunma Prefecture is a musical road.

History
Route 122 was originally designated on 18 May 1953 from Maebashi to Mito. This was redesignated as Route 50 on 1 April 1963 and the current Route 122 was designated the same day.

See also

References

External links

122
Roads in Gunma Prefecture
Roads in Saitama Prefecture
Roads in Tochigi Prefecture
Roads in Tokyo
Musical roads in Japan